9,10-Dihydroxyanthracene is an organic compound with the formula (C6H4CHOH)2. It is the hydroquinone form of 9,10-anthraquinone (AQ).  It formed when AQ is hydrogenated. It is easily dissolved in alkaline solutions and is often called soluble anthraquinone (SAQ).

In the so-called anthraquinone process, hydrogen peroxide is manufactured as one of the product in the oxygen oxidation of a substituted 9,10-dihydroxyanthracene to its corresponding anthraquinone, such as 2-ethylanthraquinone.

See also 
 Sodium 2-anthraquinonesulfonate, a water-soluble anthraquinone derivative

References

Anthracenes
Phenols